Call Me What You Like may refer to:
Call Me What You Like (Keane song)
Call Me What You Like (Lovejoy song)